Manfred Maurus was a German scientist, assistant professor at the Ludwig Maximilian University of Munich, researcher and head of the Department of Behavioral Physiology at the Max Planck Institute of Psychiatry. Maurus was a pioneer in neuroethology, starting his work with Dr. Detlev Ploog. He specialized in investigating the neural basis of behavior in freely behaving squirrel monkeys ('Saimiri sciureus'), using radio-controlled electrical brain stimulation. Among his coworkers were Helmut Pruscha, Birgit Kühlmorgen, Paul Müller-Preuss, and Uwe Jürgens.

He retired to Canada and died January 15, 2008.

Bibliography

Maurus M, Streit KM, Barclay D, Wiesner E, Kuehlmorgen B. Interrelations between structure and function in the vocal repertoire of Saimiri. Asking the monkeys themselves where to split and where to lump. Eur Arch Psychiatry Neurol Sci. 1986;236(1):35-9. 
Muller-Preuss P, Maurus M. Coding of call components essential for intraspecific communication through auditory neurons in the squirrel monkey. Naturwissenschaften. 1985 Aug;72(8):437-8. 
Maurus M, Geissler B, Kuhlmorgen B, Weisner E. The effects of brain stimulation when categorizing the behavioral repertoire of squirrel monkeys. Behav Neural Biol. 1981 Aug;32(4):438-47. 
Maurus M, Kuhlmorgen B, Hartmann-Wiesner E, Pruscha H. An approach to the interpretation of the communicative meaning of visual signals in agonistic behavior of squirrel monkeys. Folia Primatol (Basel). 1975;23(3):208-26. 
Hupfer K, Maurus M. Operant conditioning of the squirrel monkey with social reinforcement. Naturwissenschaften. 1975 Jan;62(1):42-3. 
Hohne A, Maurus M. Semiautomatic conversion of behavioral data from film to paper tape for computer analysis. Physiol Behav. 1974 Aug;13(2):317-9. 
Maurus M, Kuhlmorgen B, Hartmann E. Concerning the influence of experimental conditions on social interactions initiated by telestimulation in squirrel monkey groups. Brain Res. 1973 Dec 21;64:271-80. 
Pruscha H, Maurus M. A statistical method for the classification of behavior units occurring in primate communication. Behav Biol. 1973 Oct;9(4):511-6. 
Maurus M, Hohne A, Peetz H, Wanke J. Technical requirements for the recording of significant social signals in squirrel monkey groups. Physiol Behav. 1972 May;8(5):969-71. 
Maurus M, Pruscha H. Quantitative analyses of behavioral sequences elicited by automated telestimulation in squirrel monkeys. Exp Brain Res. 1972;14(4):372-94. 
Maurus M, Ploog D. Social signals in squirrel monkeys: analysis by cerebral radio stimulation. Exp Brain Res. 1971 Feb 25;12(2):171-83. 
Maurus M. Investigation of social behaviour in primates (Saimiri sciureus) by means of telestimulation technique. Brain Res. 1970 Dec 18;24(3):553. 
Maurus M, Peetz HG, Jurgens U. Electronic sound recognition switch for automatic control of remote stimulus studies on Saimiri sciureus. Naturwissenschaften. 1970 Mar;57(3):141. German. 
Jurgens U, Maurus M, Ploog D, Winter P. Vocalization in the squirrel monkey (Saimiri sciureus) elicited by brain stimulation. Exp Brain Res. 1967;4(2):114-7. 
Castell R, Maurus M. The so-called marking with urine in squirrel monkeys (Saimiri sciureus) in relation to environmental and emotional factors . Folia Primatol (Basel). 1967;6(3):170-6. German. 
Maurus M. New long-range stimulus apparatus for small primates. Naturwissenschaften. 1967;54(22):593. German. 
Maurus M, Mitra J, Ploog D. Cerebral representation of the clitoris in ovariectomized squirrel monkeys. Exp Neurol. 1965 Nov;13(3):283-8. 

German neuroscientists
Year of birth missing
Place of birth missing
2008 deaths
Scientists from Munich